Rubén Darío (1867–1916) was a Nicaraguan poet.

Rubén Darío may also refer to:

Named for Rubén Darío
Rubén Darío National Theatre, Managua, Nicaragua
National Library of Nicaragua Rubén Darío, Managua, Nicaragua
Rubén Darío (Madrid Metro), a railway station in Madrid, Spain
Ruben Dario Middle School, Miami, Florida, US

Other people
Rubén Darío Aguilera (born 1978), Paraguayan footballer
Rubén Darío Bustos (born 1981), Colombian football player
Rubén Darío Ferrer (born 1975), Argentine footballer
Rubén Darío Gigena (born 1980), Argentine football striker
Rubén Darío Gómez (1940–2010), Colombian road racing cyclist
Rubén Darío Hernández (born 1965), Colombian football striker 
Rubén Darío Insúa (born 1961), Argentine football player and manager
Rubén Darío Larrosa (born 1979), Argentine professional footballer
Rubén Darío Palacio (1962–2003), Colombian boxer
Rubén Darío Paredes (born 1933), military ruler of Panama from 1982 to 1983
Rubén Darío Velázquez (born 1975), Colombian football midfielder